Aermediterranea was an Italian airline founded in 1981 as a subsidiary of Alitalia to replace Itavia on the Italian domestic scene.  The airline was owned by Alitalia and ATI, and was later merged into ATI in 1985.

History
The Italian Minister of Transport Rino Formica announced the formation of Aermediterranea as a joint-venture between Alitalia and ATI.  Alitalia provided 55% of the capital and ATI provided the remaining 45%.  After the revocation of the air operator's certificate of the private airline Itavia, all of the flight crew was transferred over to Aermediterranea.

The airline entered service on 1 July 1981, using eight McDonnell Douglas DC-9-32s, serving 572,000 passengers in 1982. In 1985, Aermediterranea  ceased to exist and its employees and aircraft were transferred over to ATI, which was itself later absorbed by the parent company Alitalia in 1994.

Fleet
The Aermediterranea fleet used eight McDonnell Douglas DC-9-32 aircraft.

Destinations
In addition to charter service to and from cities in Europe (mainly in Germany and England), Aermediterranea operated flights between the following Italian cities:

 Rome - Fiumicino
 Napoli
 Milan
 Torino
 Bergamo
 Trieste
 Verona
 Venezia

 Bologna
 Rimini
 Pisa
 Ancona
 Pescara
 Bari
 Lamezia Terme
 Brindisi

 Alghero
 Cagliari
 Palermo
 Trapani
 Catania
 Lampedusa

See also
 List of defunct airlines of Italy

References

External links

1985 disestablishments in Italy
Defunct airlines of Italy
Airlines established in 1981
Airlines disestablished in 1985
Italian companies established in 1981